Naib Subedar Deepak Punia, is an Indian freestyle wrestler and Junior Commissioned Officer (JCO) in the Indian Army who won a silver medal at the 2019 World Wrestling Championships in the freestyle 86 kg category and secured a place in the 2020 Summer Olympics. He was born in the Jhajjar district of Haryana. He is the reigning Commonwealth champion in his weight category. He bagged a gold medal at the 2022 Birmingham Commonwealth Games after beating Pakistan's Muhammad Inam in the 86kg final bout.

References

External links
 

Living people
Indian male sport wrestlers
World Wrestling Championships medalists
People from Jhajjar district
Sport wrestlers from Haryana
Asian Wrestling Championships medalists
Wrestlers at the 2020 Summer Olympics
Olympic wrestlers of India
Wrestlers at the 2022 Commonwealth Games
Commonwealth Games gold medallists for India
Commonwealth Games medallists in wrestling
1999 births
Indian Army personnel
Recipients of the Arjuna Award
21st-century Indian people
20th-century Indian people
Medallists at the 2022 Commonwealth Games